Lagoa Santa is a municipality in southeast Goiás state, Brazil.  Lagoa Santa is one of the most recent municipalities in the state, having been installed on 1 January 2001.  It has hot water springs and is being developed as  a resort.

Location
Lagoa Santa is located on the border with the state of Mato Grosso do Sul, divided by the Aporé River, a tributary of the Paraná.  It is 483 kilometers from the state capital, Goiânia and is connected by highways BR-153 and BR-060, leaving from São Paulo, and from Goiânia, by highways Br-060 and BR-164 and GO-206 and GO-302.

Connections with the state capital are made by BR-060 / Abadia de Goiás / Guapó / Indiara / Acreúna / Rio Verde / GO-174 / GO-422 / Caçu / GO-206 / Itarumã / GO-178 / Itajá / GO-302.

It has boundaries on the north, east, and west with Itajá, and on the south with the state of Mato Grosso do Sul.

Geography
The average elevation is 380 meters and the average annual temperature is approximately 20 °C to 24 °C, with the minimum of 17 °C and the maximum of 31 °C.  It is not uncommon to have cold fronts in the region, which come from the south.  The climate is very humid, with humidity around 70%.

The town is crossed by the Rio Aporé, on the border with Mato Grosso do Sul.  In the tropical forest along the river there is a natural lake, Lagoa Santa, with water temperatures of around 31 °C.  This lake gave the town its name and is visited by tourists from all over the country, who seek a cure in the warm and medicinal waters of the lake.

Demographics
Population density in 2007: 2.67 inhabitants/km2 
Total population in 2007: 5,409
Urban population in 2007: 852
Rural population in 2007: 373

The economy
The economy is based on services, government jobs, modest agriculture and cattle raising, and income generated from tourism.  The cattle herd was 48,000 (2006).
Economic Data (2007)
Industrial establishments: 0
Retail establishments in 2007: 22
Automobiles: 60 (2007)

Main agricultural products in ha.(2006)
rice:        100  
corn:      200

Farm Data (2006)in ha.
Number of farms:                81
Total area:                  42,940 
Area of permanent crops:       33
Area of perennial crops:     166
Area of natural pasture:     31,372 
Persons dependent on farming: 212
Farms with tractors:            37
Number of tractors:             66 IBGE

Education and Health
There were 02 schools in activity (2006) and no hospitals.  
Literacy Rate: n/a
Infant mortality rate: n/a (in 1,000 live births)

Lagoa Santa was first created a district of Itajá in 1988 with the name Termas de Lagoa Santa.  In 1998 it became a municipality with the present name.

See also
List of municipalities in Goiás
Microregions of Goiás

References

Frigoletto
 Sepin

Municipalities in Goiás